Alex Riggs (born March 17, 1988) is an American soccer player who plays as a goalkeeper.

Career

College
Riggs played for Missouri State University from 2006 to 2010. He was named the Missouri Valley Conference Defender of the Year in 2009, and Missouri Valley Conference Goalkeeper of the Year in 2010.

Professional
Riggs signed with the Columbus Crew of Major League Soccer in 2011, but did not appear in any games with the club.

In April 2015, Riggs signed with United Soccer League expansion side Saint Louis FC. He was loaned out later that season to MLS club Sporting Kansas City for a U.S. Open Cup match against FC Dallas, but remained on the bench as an unused substitute. He made his first professional start against Louisville City at World Wide Technology Soccer Park on September 19, 2015.

References

External links
 Saint Louis FC bio
 Missouri State University bio

1988 births
Living people
American soccer players
Columbus Crew players
Saint Louis FC players
Association football goalkeepers
Soccer players from Missouri
USL Championship players
People from St. Peters, Missouri